Hells Canyon National Recreation Area is a United States national recreation area on the borders of the U.S. states of Oregon and Idaho. Managed by the U.S. Forest Service as part of the Wallowa-Whitman National Forest, the recreation area was established by Congress and signed by President Gerald Ford in late 1975 to protect the historic and archaeological values of the Hells Canyon area and the area of the Snake River between Hells Canyon Dam and the Oregon–Washington border.

Roughly  of the recreation area are designated the Hells Canyon Wilderness. The largest portion of the area lies in eastern Wallowa County, Oregon. Smaller portions lie in southwestern Idaho County, Idaho, northwestern Adams County, Idaho, and northeastern Baker County, Oregon.

It was formally dedicated in 1976, in June in Idaho, and in late July in Oregon.

Hells Canyon Archeological District

All or partly included in the HCNRA is the Hells Canyon Archeological District, a  historic district listed on the U.S. National Register of Historic Places. It includes 536 contributing sites, 23 contributing buildings, and 58 other contributing structures.

There are many sites with pictographs, the largest of which are Buffalo Eddy, with more than five hundred pictographs, and Pittsburg Landing, where nearly thirty boulders are covered with them. An interpretive site has a short trail to interpretive panels displaying petroglyphs and pictographs.

Recreation 
There are 17 campgrounds in the national recreation area. Pittsburg Landing, with a river boat launch is the only area with RV camping on the Idaho side, and there are seven on the Oregon side.

Snake River National Recreation Trail
The Snake River National Recreation Trail #102 (SRNRT) lies within the Hells Canyon National Recreation Area and along the Idaho side of the Snake River, from near Lamont Springs, downstream, to Pittsburg Landing.  The SRNRT was designated in 1980 under the National Trails System Act.  It was constructed during the period of the late 1800s to about the 1930s.  Access to the SRNRT can be gained via road to the trailhead at Pittsburg Landing on the north end of the trail, or, by boat access near Hells Canyon Dam on the south end of the trail.  Access can also be gained via trails leading from Seven Devils Wilderness Area trail head at Windy Saddle (elevation 7200') via either the Granite Creek trails or Sheep Creek trails.

References
 Ewert, Sara E. Dant. "Evolution of an Environmentalist: Senator Frank Church and the Hells Canyon Controversy." Montana: The Magazine of Western History 51 (Spring 2001): 36–51.

External links

 Hells Canyon National Recreation Area

1975 establishments in Oregon
National Recreation Areas of the United States
Protected areas established in 1975
Protected areas of Adams County, Idaho
Protected areas of Idaho County, Idaho
Protected areas of Baker County, Oregon
Protected areas of Wallowa County, Oregon
Wallowa–Whitman National Forest